Hyundai Card (Hangul:현대카드) is a credit card company under Hyundai Motor Group headquartered in Seoul, South Korea. In 1995, Hyundai Motor Group acquired Diners Club Korea, and changed its name to Hyundai Card in 2001. The company’s strategic alliance with the GE Consumer Finance in October 2005 boosted the fledgling business in the heavily competitive Korean credit card market.

Starting with the launch of the company’s signature “Hyundai Card M” in May 2003, the company has unveiled a series of premium cards, including Korea’s first-ever VVIP card “the Black,” followed by “the Purple,” “the Red,” “the Green,” and “the Pink.” 

The company also simplified its credit card portfolio by categorizing products into two in terms of the types of customer rewards ─ points and discounts. Its points-focused card series include M·M2·M3 BOOST, T3, and ZERO·ZERO MOBILE. Meanwhile, its discounts-focused products include X·X2·X3 BOOST, DIGITAL LOVER, and ZERO·ZERO MOBILE. In April 2021, Hyundai Card launched Z Series which consist of three types of cards – Z Family, Z Work and Z Ontact – depending on the areas the cards offer heavy discounts.  

Seeking to transform into a digital company with its data science capabilities, Hyundai Card has been actively expanding its Private Label Credit Card (PLCC) business. With the establishment of a “data alliance” with PLCC partners, who are champions in their respective industries, Hyundai Card is creating synergy with those partners and laying the groundwork for long-term growth. The company has about 500 employees in its data science team, which is roughly one-third of its total headcount.

As of the end of 2020, Hyundai Card had 8.9 million credit cardholders, and posted KRW 12.2 trillion in credit purchase volume. The company is spurring global expansion with its first overseas branch in Tokyo in August, 2020. As of April 2021, Hyundai Card has 9.15 million credit cardholders.

In recent years, Hyundai Card has become known for its data science. The company has about 500 employees in its data science team, which is roughly one-third of its total headcount.

History
In October 2001, Hyundai Motor Group acquired Diners Club Korea and changed its name to Hyundai Card Co., Ltd. In May 2003, the company launched the signature Hyundai Card M and the Save Point service, which gives advanced M points, Hyundai Card’s own reward points, for Hyundai/Kia cars and other large purchases and retrieves the amount with the M points generated from future M card usage.

From 2004 the company released a series of “alphabet cards“ that are “tailored to the customers’ lifestyle.” The company became the biggest hit in the local credit card industry with the largest members of 8 million for a single credit card brand.

In 2005, the company has partnered with GE Consumer Finance – which later changed its name to GE Capital— allowing Hyundai Card to acquire GE’s risk management know-how and GE to acquire a portion of Hyundai brand. The company launched ”the Black“ in 2005 for the highest-end credit card users, followed by “the Purple” in 2006, “the Red” in 2008, “the Green” in 2018, and “the Pink” in 2020. The “Hyundai Card Zero,” launched in November 2011, is designed to keep up with the changing customer lifestyle.

In July 2013, the company announced “Hyundai Card Chapter Two,” a streamlining scheme of its product portfolio. All products were trimmed according to the two main pillars – point mileage and cashback—and instead the customers were given the choice to use their point mileage and cashback freely if they met with a certain usage standard.

In October 2015, the company launched ”Digital Hyundai Card” project, that goes beyond introducing mobile/online products, while changing its core nature to an agile and digital-oriented company.

Following the launch of Korea’s first PLCC “E-mart e card” in 2015, the company formed PLCC partnership with Hyundai Motor and Kia Motors in 2017. Then followed eBay Korea in 2018 as well as Costco, and SSG.COM, an e-commerce company affiliated with Shinsegae Group, in 2019. By the end of 2020, Hyundai Card partnered up with 10 different companies for its PLCC series. Hyundai Card has launched or is preparing to launch more PLCC products with 14 champion brands including SOCAR, MUSINSA, Genesis, and NAVER.

Products

Premium Card
the Black, the Purple, the Red, the Green, the Pink

Point Card
M·M2·M3 BOOST, T3, ZERO·ZERO MOBILE Edition2 (points-focused)

Discount Card
X·X2·X3 BOOST, DIGITAL LOVER, ZERO·ZERO MOBILE Edition2 (discounts-focused)

Z Card 
Z family, Z work, Z ontact

Private Label Credit Card (PLCC) 
MUSINSA Hyundai Card, Socar Hyundai Card, Baemin Hyundai Card, Starbucks Hyundai Card, Korean Air Hyundai Card, GS Caltex Hyundai Card, SSG.COM Hyundai Card, Emart eCard, Costco Reward Hyundai Card, Hyundai BLUEmembers Card, Kia Members Card, Genesis Hyundai Card, Smile Card (ebay)

Corporate Culture

Company Slogan

 Strategy + Execution: There can be no execution without strategy and no strategy without execution.
 Speed: Speed is the only variable separating winners and losers in the final match.
 Never-ending Change: Existence requires continuous change.
 Diverse yet United: Top-level organizations are built upon diverse elements working together in tandem.

Digital Transformation Hyundai Card
“Digital Hyundai Card” is a service provided through smartphone application offering customers with a more convenient and secure way to use a credit card.

Digital Hyundai Card Project
The Lock service allows users to shut down their card function whenever they want, with a swipe on the credit card app. Limit, on the other hand, can be used to set credit limits for certain time periods. The Virtual Card Numbers prevent card identity theft online by providing users with a set of numbers that can replace the customers’ actual credit card information online. The PayShot makes online shopping easier by simplifying the payment process. Shoppers only need to log into one of seven different online shopping malls when using their Hyundai cards. Chameleon allows the user to have multiple Hyundai cards on one card and select the card with benefits of his choice in Hyundai card application. Buddy is an AI chatbot service that offers real-time counselling on inquiries about Hyundai card. OverseaTranfer is Hyundai card members can wire money to the Hyundai card payment account without registering a bank account number by paying only KRW 3,000 of remittance fee per transaction.

Hyundai Card App 3.0 
Hyundai Card app 3.0, launched after its renewal, has been designed to maximize user convenience by offering information optimized for respective users. The app is equipped with a "Dual Home" structure, which divides the user's favorite menus into two categories. "Account Home" has adopted a highly legible interface, allowing users to browse their card spending data at a glance, whereas "Content Home" comes up with varied content deemed to be interesting for users after artificial intelligence analyzes their tastes and patterns.

Hyundai Card Spending Care by Personetics 
Hyundai Card deployed an AI-based digital service jointly developed with Personetics, an Israeli fintech company. The developed feature added to the Hyundai Card smartphone app analyzes each customer’s credit card transactions and offers near-real time personalized and proactive spending insights.

Branding

Space Branding
Vinyl & Plastic by Hyundai Card, opened in June 2016, located in Itaewon in Seoul, Korea, boasts curated collections of over 20,000 vinyl LPs and CDs, covering a wide variety of musical genres. STORAGE by Hyundai Card, located in the same building as VINYL & PLASTIC by Hyundai Card, is an exhibition space showing a selection of contemporary pieces from a variety of disciplines, spanning art, film, architecture and design.

Hyundai Card Music Library & Understage, opened in May 2015, are located on the main street of Itaewon in Seoul. The library is where visitors can enjoy an analogue music culture while the Understage is a cultural space for musicians of all genres. The library features collections of more than 10,000 vinyl albums including around 400 rare albums since the 1950s and onward. There are also 4,000 music related publications. The Understage aims to host a wide range of performances.

Hyundai Card Travel Library, opened in May 2014, is filled with 15,000 books and maps of 92 different cities in Cheongdam-dong in Seoul, Korea. Designed by the interior designer Katayama Masamichi of Wonderwall with the concept of “stock of curiosity”, the Library not only features a book collection based on 13 themes but also contains elements that touches different perspectives of travel.

In February 2013, Hyundai Card Design Library, located in Gahoe-dong, central Seoul, displays 18,000 design-related books that have been published at home and abroad. About 70 percent of the books are rarely procured across the world, among which about 3,000 books are either out of print or had not been introduced here.

Hyundai Card CARD FACTORY is located on the ninth floor of the company’s headquarters, and shows the whole automated process of card production from plate issuance to the reviewing and packing.

Hyundai Card Cooking Library is a space that captures knowledge, culture, and lifestyle allowing everyone to experience culinary charm.

Hyundai Card Art Library, which opened in August 2022, is located on the main street of Itaewon in Seoul. The library is a space containing books that are related to artists and works recognized for their historical value and the philosophy of Hyundai Card. The Complete Collection such as Parkett, every exhibition book of the Museum of Modern Art in New York, a catalog of all the main exhibitions of the Venice Biennale, and the Moving Image Room are displayed.

Culture Branding
Hyundai Card Culture Project have been held since 2011, ranging from musical concerts to exhibitions and others. Hyundai Card Super Concert has featured world-renowned superstars such as Queen, Elton John, Sting, R&B artists Usher and Beyonce, singer-songwriter Billy Joel and former The Beatles and pop artist Paul McCartney. Approximately 100,000 concertgoers witnessed the very first performance of the British rock band Coldplay in Korea over the span of two days.

Corporate social responsibility
1913 Songjeong Station Market Project is the latest work of Hyundai Card’s market renovation and revitalization project. The 103-year-old Songjeong Station Market, Gwangju, was given some trim and facelift resulting in a jump of daily visitors to 4,300 in May 2016 from 200 in May 2015.  Bongpyeong Market Project in 2014 conserved the basic infrastructure of the market and adopted exterior design in each shops under the slogan of “Development for Sustainability”, encouraging merchants to strive for change.  Dream Realization Project has helped mom and pop store owners to give a boost to their operation by adopting design factors. A total of 10 stores ranging from grocery, bistro, beauty shop, delicatessen and others have been provided with management consulting, interior redesigning and others to change their operations. The stores have since then seen a sales rise by an average of two-folds.Hyundai Card Gapado Project is The Gapado Island situated off the southern coast of Jeju Island at one point in time experienced damage. Hyundai has with steadfast efforts turned Gapado Island into a success story and continues its transformation towards becoming a sustainable island where ecology, economy, and culture tranquilly co-exist.

References

External links
 Hyundai Card Site
Hyundai Card Newsroom 
 Hyundai Card Homepage 
 Costco

Companies of South Korea
Companies based in Seoul
Financial services companies established in 2001
Credit cards
Hyundai Motor Group